The 2018–19 Namibia Premier League is the 29th season of the Namibia Premier League, the top-tier football league in Namibia. The season started on 9 November 2018.

Standings

References

Namibia
Seasons in Namibian football leagues
Prem
Prem